Turner County Jail, also known as Turner Castle and now the Crime and Punishment Museum, and home to The Last Meal Cafe, is a historic jail building in Ashburn, Georgia. It was added to the National Register of Historic Places in 1982. The building is located at 243 College Street.

It was built in 1906-07 as the county jail for the newly formed Turner County, Georgia. It cost $10,855 and was designed by Wagoner and Dobson of Montgomery, Alabama. Its interior has arched corrugated metal and concrete ceilings.

See also
National Register of Historic Places listings in Turner County, Georgia

References

External links
Crime and Punishment Museum website

Jails on the National Register of Historic Places in Georgia (U.S. state)
Buildings and structures in Turner County, Georgia